{{DISPLAYTITLE:C14H18N2O}}
The molecular formula C14H18N2O may refer to:

 AL-37350A, a tryptamine derivative
 BRL-54443, agonist of 5-HT1E and 5-HT1F serotonin receptors
 CP-132,484, a tryptamine derivative
 4-HO-pyr-T, a tryptamine derivative
 4-HO-McPT, a tryptamine derivative
 Ibudilast, an antiinflammatory drug
 Propyphenazone, an analgesic